Falaise was a railway station in the French town of Falaise, Calvados.

The station was built by the CF de l'Ouest in pure Ouest architecture, and opened on 1 November 1859. It saw the arrival of a line from Flers (Berjou-Pont-d'Ouilly) on 15 April 1874 and from Falaise-Château by the Calvados railway in 1904.

The main line to Caen closed on 1 July 1953 and the branch line from Berjou on 1 March 1938. at the birth of the SNCF. The narrow gauge line closed in 1932.

The site of the former station was recently redeveloped and a supermarket built where the building once stood.

Defunct railway stations in Calvados
Railway stations in France opened in 1859
Railway stations closed in 1953